The Arc de Triomphe du Carrousel is a triumphal arch in Paris, located in the Place du Carrousel. It is an example of Neoclassical architecture in the Corinthian order. It was built between 1806 and 1808 to commemorate Napoleon's military victories in the Wars of the Third and Fourth Coalitions. The Arc de Triomphe de l'Étoile, at the far end of the Champs Élysées, was designed in the same year; it is about twice the size and was not completed until 1836.

Description

Around its exterior are eight Corinthian columns of marble, topped by eight soldiers of the Empire. On the pediment, between the soldiers, bas-reliefs depict:

 the Arms of the Kingdom of Italy with figures representing History and the Arts
 the Arms of the French Empire with Victory, Fame, History, and Abundance
 Wisdom and Strength holding the arms of the Kingdom of Italy, accompanied by Prudence and Victory.

Napoleon's diplomatic and military victories are commemorated by bas-reliefs executed in rose marble.  They depict:

 the Peace of Pressburg
 Napoleon entering Munich
 Napoleon entering Vienna, sculptor Louis-Pierre Deseine
 the Battle of Austerlitz, sculptor Jean-Joseph Espercieux
 the Tilsit Conference
 the surrender of Ulm, sculptor Pierre Cartellier

The arch is derivative of the triumphal arches of the Roman Empire, in particular that of Septimius Severus in Rome. The subjects of the bas-reliefs devoted to the battles were selected by the director of the Musée Napoléon (located at the time in the Louvre), Vivant Denon, and designed by Charles Meynier.

The upper frieze on the on entablement has sculptures of soldiers: Auguste Marie Taunay's cuirassier (left), Charles-Louis Corbet's dragoon, Joseph Chinard's horse grenadier and Jacques-Edme Dumont's sapper.

The quadriga atop the entablement is a copy of the so-called Horses of Saint Mark that adorn the top of the main door of the St Mark's Basilica in Venice but during both French empires the originals were brought up for special occasions.

History

Designed by Charles Percier and Pierre François Léonard Fontaine, the arch was built between 1806 and 1808 by the Emperor Napoleon I, on the model of the Arch of Constantine (312 AD) in Rome, as a gateway of the Tuileries Palace, the Imperial residence. The destruction of the Tuileries Palace during the Paris Commune in 1871, allowed an unobstructed view west towards the Arc de Triomphe.

It was originally surmounted by the Horses of Saint Mark from Saint Mark's Cathedral in Venice, which had been captured in 1798 by Napoleon. In 1815, following the Battle of Waterloo and the Bourbon restoration, France ceded the quadriga to the Austrian Empire which had annexed Venice under the terms of the Congress of Vienna. The Austrians immediately returned the statuary to Venice. The horses of Saint Mark were replaced in 1828 by a quadriga sculpted by Baron François Joseph Bosio, depicting Peace riding in a triumphal chariot led by gilded Victories on both sides. The composition commemorates the Restoration of the Bourbons following Napoleon's downfall.

The Arc du Carrousel inspired the design of Marble Arch, constructed in London between 1826 and 1833.

Geography
The Arc de Triomphe du Carrousel is at the eastern end of Paris Axe historique ("historic axis"), a nine-kilometre-long linear route which dominates much of the northwestern quadrant of the city.

Looking west, the arch is aligned with the obelisk in the Place de la Concorde, the centerline of the grand boulevard Champs-Élysées, the Arc de Triomphe at the Place de l'Étoile, and, although it is not directly visible from the Place du Carrousel, the Grande Arche de la Défense. Thus, the axis begins and ends with an arch. When the Arc du Carrousel was built, however, an observer in the Place du Carrousel was impeded from any view westward. The central part of the Palais des Tuileries intervened to block the line of sight to the west. When the Tuileries was burned down during the Paris Commune in 1871, and its ruins were swept away, the great axis, as it presently exists, was opened all the way to the Place du Carrousel and the Louvre.

References

External links

  
 
 Arc de Triomphe du Carrousel at Napoleon.org

Buildings and structures completed in 1808
Buildings and structures in the 1st arrondissement of Paris
Monuments and memorials in Paris
Triumphal arches in France